{{Automatic taxobox
| name = Allosauroids
| fossil_range = Middle Jurassic–Late Cretaceous,  (Possible Late Toarcian and Late Maastrichtian records)
| image = Allosaurus skull SDNHM.jpg
| image_caption = Allosaurus fragilis skull, San Diego Natural History Museum
| taxon = Allosauroidea
| authority = Marsh, 1878
| type_species = Allosaurus fragilis
| type_species_authority = Marsh, 1877
| subdivision_ranks = Subgroups
| subdivision = *Asfaltovenator
Xuanhanosaurus
Erectopus
Unquillosaurus?
Scipionyx?
Metriacanthosauridae
Piatnitzkysauridae?Allosauria 
Allosauridae
CarcharodontosauriaDatanglong?LusovenatorSiamraptorUlughbegsaurus?
Carcharodontosauridae
Neovenatoridae
Megaraptora?
}}

Allosauroidea is a superfamily or clade of theropod dinosaurs which contains four families — the Metriacanthosauridae, Allosauridae, Carcharodontosauridae, and Neovenatoridae. Allosauroids, alongside the family Megalosauroidea, were among the apex predators that were active during the Middle Jurassic to Late Cretaceous periods. The most famous and best understood allosauroid is the North American genus Allosaurus.

The oldest-known allosauroid, Shidaisaurus jinae, appeared in the early Middle Jurassic about 174 million years ago (Earliest Aalenian stage) of China. The last known definitive surviving members of the group died out around 89 million years ago in Asia (Shaochilong) and South America (Mapusaurus), though the megaraptorans, which survived until the end of Maastrichtian, may belong to the group as well. A frontal assigned to an allosauroid found to be most closely related to Sinraptor has also been found in the Coniacian (89-86.3 Ma) of Argentina, however this has been reinterpreted to belong to a megaraptoran, which may or may not be allosauroids. Additional, but highly fragmentary, remains were suggested to belong to carcharodontosaurids are known from the Late Maastrichtian (70-66 Ma ago) in Brazil, but were later interpreted as those of abelisaurids. Furthermore, an indeterminate toe bone from the Campanian of New Zealand has also been noted to share features with allosauroids, but until more material of this taxon is unearthed, its taxonomy is uncertain. The enigmatic Unquillosaurus from the Campanian or Maastrichtian Los Blanquitos Formation in Argentina has been found to likely be a carcharodontosaurid by Carrano et al. (2012).

Allosauroids had long, narrow skulls, large orbits, three-fingered hands, and usually had "horns" or ornamental crests on their heads. Although allosauroids vary in size, the group maintains a similar center of mass and hip position on their bodies. Allosauroids also exhibit reptilian-style immune systems, secreting fibrin at injured sites to prevent infections from spreading through the bloodstream. This characteristic has been observed by examining injuries and infections on allosauroid bones. It is possible that allosauroids were social animals, as many remains of allosauroids have been found in close proximity to each other. Allosauroids were likely active predators, and from studying endocasts, probably best responded to odors and loud low-frequency noises.

 Description 

Allosauroids share certain distinctive features, one of which is a triangular-shaped pubic boot. Allosauroids have 3 fingers per hand, with the second and third digit being approximately equal in length. The femur is larger than the tibia. Another defining feature of allosauroids is that the chevron bases on their tails have anterior and posterior bone growth. The body of allosauroids can reach up to 10 meters in length; the length of the body from the tail to the hip is between 54% and 62% of the total body length, and the length of the body from the head to the hip is between 38% and 46% of the total body length. Allosauroids scaled their limbs relative to their body in a way similar to how other large theropods, like the tyrannosaurids, did. During the Cretaceous, some allosauroids grew to sizes similar to those of the largest tyrannosaurids. These large allosauroids lived in the same time period as the other large theropods found in the upper Morrison and Tendaguru formations.

Allosauroids maintained a similar center of mass across all sizes, which is found to be between 37% and 58% of the femoral length anterior to the hip. Other similarities across all allosauroids include the structure of their hind limb and pelvis. The pelvis in particular is thought to be designed to reduce stress regardless of body size. In particular, the way the femur is inclined reduces the bending and torsion stress. Furthermore, like other animals with tails, allosauroids possess a caudofemoralis longus (CFL) muscle that allowed them to flex theirs. Larger allosauroids are found to have a lower CFL muscle-to-body-mass proportion that smaller allosauroids.

In addition to body similarities, allosauroids are also united by certain skull features. Some of the defining ones include a smaller mandibular fenestra, a short quadrate bone, and a short connection between the braincase and the palate. Allosauroid skulls are about 2.5 to 3 times longer as they are tall. Their narrow skull along with their serrated teeth allow allosauroids to better slice flesh off of their prey. Allosauroid teeth are flat and have equally-sized denticles on both edges. The flat side of the tooth face the sides of the skull, while the edges align on the same plane as the skull.  From analyzing the skull of different allosauroids, the volume of the cranial vault ranges between 95 milliliters in Sinraptor to 250 milliliters in Giganotosaurus.

Classification

The clade Allosauroidea was originally proposed by Phil Currie and Zhao (1993; p. 2079), and later used as an undefined stem-based taxon by Paul Sereno (1997). Sereno (1998; p. 64) was the first to provide a stem-based definition for the Allosauroidea, defining the clade as "All neotetanurans closer to Allosaurus than to Neornithes." Kevin Padian (2007) used a node-based definition, defined the Allosauroidea as Allosaurus, Sinraptor, their most recent common ancestor, and all of its descendants. Thomas R. Holtz and colleagues (2004; p. 100) and  Phil Currie and Ken Carpenter (2000), among others, have followed this node-based definition. Of the allosauroids, sinraptorids make up the most basal group.

However, in some analyses (such as Currie & Carpenter, 2000), the placement of the carcharodontosaurids relative to the allosaurids and sinraptorids is uncertain, and therefore it is uncertain whether or not the carcharodontosaurids are allosauroids (Currie & Carpenter, 2000).

The cladogram presented here is simplified after the 2012 analysis by Carrano, Benson and Sampson after the exclusion of three "wildcard" taxa Poekilopleuron, Xuanhanosaurus and Streptospondylus.

In 2019, Rauhut and Pol described Asfaltovenator vialidadi, a basal allosauroid displaying a mosaic of primitive and derived features seen within Tetanurae. Their phylogenetic analysis found traditional Megalosauroidea to represent a basal grade of carnosaurs, paraphyletic with respect to Allosauroidea. Because the authors amended the definition of Allosauroidea to include all theropods that are closer to Allosaurus fragilis than to either Megalosaurus bucklandii or Neornithes, the Piatnitzkysauridae was found to fall within Allosauroidea. A cladogram displaying the relationships they recovered is shown below:

 Paleobiology and behavior 
Multiple severe injuries have been found on allosauroid remains, which implies that allosauroids were frequently in dangerous situations and supports the hypothesis of an active, predatory lifestyle. Despite the multitude of injuries, only a few of those injuries show signs of infection. For those injuries that did become infected, the infections were usually local to the site of the injury, implying that the allosauroid immune response was able to quickly stop any infection from spreading to the rest of the body. This type of immune response is similar to modern reptilian immune responses; reptiles secrete fibrin near infected areas and localize the infection before it can spread via the bloodstream.

The injuries were also found to be mostly healed. This healing may indicate that allosauroids had an intermediate metabolic rate, similar to non-avian reptiles, which means they require fewer nutrients in order to survive. A lower nutrient requirement means allosauroids do not need to undertake frequent hunts, which lowers their risk of sustaining traumatic injuries.

Although the remains of other large theropods like tyrannosaurids bear evidence of fighting within their species and with other predators, the remains of allosauroids do not bear much evidence of injuries from theropod combat. Most notably, despite a good fossil record, allosauroid skulls lack the distinctive face-biting wounds that are common in tyrannosaurid skulls, leaving open the question of if allosauroids engaged in interspecies and intraspecies fighting. Allosauroid remains are also often found in groups, which implies social behavior. While there are alternative explanations for the groupings, like predator traps or habitat reduction due to drought, the frequency of finding allosauroid remains in groups supports the social animal theory. As social animals, allosauroids would share the burden of hunting, allowing injured members of the pack to recover faster.

 Paleobiogeography 
The paleobiogeographical history of allosauroids closely follows the order that Pangaea separated into the modern continents. By the Middle Jurassic period, tetanurans had spread to every continent and diverged into the allosauroids and the coelurosaurs. Allosauroids first appeared in the Middle Jurassic period and were the first giant taxa (weighing more than 2 tons) in theropod history. Along with members of the superfamily Megalosauroidea, allosauroids were the apex predators that occupied the Middle Jurassic to the early Late Cretaceous periods. Allosauroids have been found in North America, South America, Europe, Africa, and Asia. Specifically, a world-wide dispersal of carcharodontosaurids likely happened in the Early Cretaceous. It has been hypothesized that the dispersal involved Italy's Apulia region (the “heel” of the Italian peninsula), which was connected to Africa by a land bridge during the Early Cretaceous period; various dinosaur footprints found in Apulia support this theory.

Allosauroids were present in both the northern and southern continents during the Jurassic and Early Cretaceous, but they were later displaced by the tyrannosauroids in North America and Asia during the Late Cretaceous. This is likely due to regional extinction events, which, along with increased species isolation through the severing of land connections between the continents, differentiated many dinosaurs in the Late Cretaceous.

References

 Further reading 

 
 Holtz, T. R., Jr. and Osmólska H. 2004. Saurischia; pp. 21–24 in D. B. Weishampel, P. Dodson, and H. Osmólska (eds.), The Dinosauria'' (2nd ed.), University of California Press, Berkeley.
 
 
 

 
Bajocian first appearances
Late Cretaceous extinctions